There are 18 Important Bird and Biodiversity Areas (IBAs) designated for Armenia. The following is a list of Important Bird Areas in the country:

Armenia

References